Georges Ribemont-Dessaignes (June 19, 1884 – July 9, 1974) was a French writer and artist associated with the Dada movement. He was born in Montpellier and died in Saint-Jeannet.

In addition to numerous early paintings, Ribemont-Dessaignes wrote plays, poetry, manifestos and opera librettos.  He contributed to the Dada (and later surrealist) periodical Literature.

Among Ribemont-Dessaignes' works for the theater are the plays The Emperor of China  (1916) and The Mute Canary (1919), and the opera libretti The Knife's Tears (1926) and The Three Wishes (1926), both with music by Czech composer Bohuslav Martinů.  His novels include L'Autruche aux yeux clos (1924), Ariane (1925), Le Bar du lendemain (1927), Céleste Ugolin (1928), and Monsieur Jean ou l'Amour absolu (1934).

References
Dada Performance.  Edited by Mel Gordon.  PAJ Publications; New York, 1987.

Les Larmes Du Couteau.  CD recording of Martinu's opera.  Commentary by Ales Brezina.  Supraphon, 1999.

The French Literature Companion.

External links
 Ribemont-Dessaignes' written works at the International Dada Archive at the University of Iowa Libraries. Page images of the full texts.
 Manifesto

1884 births
1974 deaths
Artists from Montpellier
French art historians
20th-century French painters
20th-century French male artists
French male painters
Dada
Prix des Deux Magots winners
French male non-fiction writers
20th-century French male writers
Writers from Montpellier
French dadaist
19th-century French male artists